Naki may refer to:

People 
 Deniz Naki (born 1989), German footballer
 Hamilton Naki (1926–2005), South African surgeon
 Honorine Dossou Naki (born 1946), Gabonese politician and diplomat
 Naki Akarobettoe (born 1984), American poet
 Naki Depass, Jamaican fashion model
 Naki Keykurun (1883–1967), Azerbaijani political figure

Other uses 
 Naki language, a language of Cameroon and Nigeria
 Naki language (Papuan), a language of Papua, Indonesia
 Naki, Iran, a village in Iran
 Taranaki Rugby Football Union, or Naki, a New Zealand rugby organisation

See also 
 Naqi (disambiguation)
 Nakki (disambiguation)